Tyumenyak (Tömänäk) is a rural locality (a selo) and the administrative centre of Tyumenyakovsky Selsoviet, Tuymazinsky District, Bashkortostan, Russia. The population was 1,070 as of 2010. There are 10 streets.

Geography 
Tyumenyak is located 14 km northeast of Tuymazy (the district's administrative centre) by road. Darvino is the nearest rural locality.

References 

Rural localities in Tuymazinsky District